Levante Unión Deportiva Femenino is the women's football team of Valencian football club Levante UD, based at Ciudad Deportiva in Buñol and playing in the Liga F.

History
Founded in 1993 as San Vicente CFF, the team was absorbed by Levante in 1998 after it won the national championship in its debut season in the top category. It subsequently attained three more leagues and six Cups between 1997 and 2008 including two doubles (2001, 2002) making it the most successful Spanish team, tied with Athletic Bilbao in leagues and RCD Espanyol in cups as of 2012. It was eliminated in its three appearances at the UEFA Women's Cup at the group stage, one round short from the quarter-finals.

Levante always ranked among the championship's top three between 2000 and 2009, but it subsequently experienced a slump ending the 2010 and 2011 seasons in mid-table. The team improved in 2012 with a 5th position, but this result marked its first absence since 1999 in the shortened Copa de la Reina. The club remained consistent for the next decade, only finishing lower than 5th once and securing 3rd place in three consecutive seasons (without challenging for the title itself) between 2018–19 and 2020–21, though there was no great impact in the cup in this period. Real Madrid officially joined the league in 2020, immediately 'raiding' Levante for Marta Corredera and Ivana Andrés and enticing away Rocío Gálvez, Esther González and Claudia Zornoza a year later.

Players

Current squad

Source: LaLiga

Former internationals

Season to season

As San Vicente CFF

As Levante UD

UEFA competition record

Titles
 Spanish League (4)
 1997, 2001, 2002, 2008
 Spanish Cup (6) 
 2000, 2001, 2002, 2004, 2005, 2007
 Spanish Supercup (2)
 1997, 2000

Invitational trophies
 COTIF (3)
 2011, 2012, 2013
 Pyrénées Cup (1)
 2012
 Sport Mundi Tournament (2)
 2009, 2010

References
Notes

Citations

External links
 Official webpage
 soccerway.com

Women's football clubs in Spain
Levante UD
Association football clubs established in 1998
1998 establishments in Spain
Primera División (women) clubs
Football clubs in Valencia